Saints Juventinus (or Juventius) and Maximinus (died 29 January 363) were members of the imperial guard of Emperor Julian. Their feast day is 25 January.

Before starting his campaign against the Sassanid Empire, Julian issued an edict that prohibited the veneration of the relics in Antioch. He also gave orders to sprinkle all the foodstuffs in the marketplace and the water in the wells with blood offered to idols.<ref>[https://oca.org/saints/lives/2009/10/09/102911-martyr-juventinus-at-antioch "Martyr Juventinus at Antioch", Orthodox Church in America]</ref> Juventius and his colleague Maximinus (also reported as Maximos or Maximus) let fall at a banquet comments on the emperor's laws against the Christians, "Does life make any sense nowadays? All things holy are despoiled. Our faith in the Lord of Creation is treated with contempt and disgrace. Wherever one is, one inhales the ugly smell of animal fat and sacrificial meat. Nowhere can one find any fresh air."
  
Being informed of this, the emperor sent for them, but could not persuade them to retract what they had said, nor to sacrifice to the gods. According to the Roman Martyrology, Julian had them stripped of their properties, beaten and beheaded.  

Saint John Chrysostom wrote a panegyric concerning them. Chrysostom makes the point that they were executed in the middle of the night on a charge of high treason, as Julian did not want to make martyrs of them by suggesting they died because of their faith. The Roman historian Ammianus Marcellinus makes no mention of Juventinus and Maximinus, nor does Gregory of Nazianzus or church historian Socrates of Constantinople.The Passion of Sergius and Bacchus'' was based on an earlier lost passion of Juventinus and Maximinus. The author took material from the stories of martyrs of Julian's time rather than that of Galerius.

References

External links
Juventinus at Patron Saints Index
Juventinus and Maximinus

Year of birth missing
363 deaths
4th-century Christian martyrs
4th-century Romans
Julian (emperor)
Saints duos